George Currant Kellar (July 31, 1879 – September 20, 1954) was a Michigan politician.

Political life
Kellar was an Alderman and President Pro Temp of the Flint City Common Council in 1916-1917.  He was elected twice as the Mayor of City of Flint first in 1917 for a single 1-year term then again for another term in 1919. In 1934, he was a Genesee County 1st District Michigan state house of representatives candidate.

References

Mayors of Flint, Michigan
1879 births
1954 deaths
Michigan city council members
Michigan Republicans
20th-century American politicians